Thomas Thaddeus Carney (January 29, 1940 – August 30, 2022) was an English-American mixologist. He was perhaps best known for serving as the bartender at Elaine Kaufman's bar and restaurant Elaine's.

Biography 
Carney was born in Liverpool, the son of Agnes Campbell and Thomas a rail worker. At the age of two, his father died of the infection tuberculosis. At the age of fourteen, he had worked on a galley of the Cunard Line, which was based at the Carnival House. Carney rode along in a ship of Bermuda for which he had emigrated to Montreal, then later emigrated to New York. After arriving, he was hired to work as a waiter at numerous restaurants.

Carney first visited Elaine Kaufman's bar and restaurant Elaine's in 1978, where he had his first drink. There was also a type of candy bar that was named after Carney, in which it was established by Reggie Jackson. He was hired to work as a bartender where he had served drinks for customers and also notable people such as film director, writer, actor and comedian Woody Allen, actor Al Pacino, singer, songwriter, actor and film producer Mick Jagger, actor Michael Caine and comedian and actor Don Rickles, among others including novelist, journalist, essayist, playwright, activist, filmmaker and actor Norman Mailer. He also had Frank Sinatra as a customer, in which Sinatra was welcomed by Carney.

In 2007, Carney retired to work as a bartender at Elaine's, in which there was a celebration for him for his retirement. After retiring, he played as a golfer for which he had established at least two restaurants in Westwood, New Jersey and Sparkill, New York. Carney had moved to Florida. He died in August 2022 of chronic obstructive pulmonary disease at his home in Palm City, Florida in his sleep, at the age of 82.

References 

1940 births
2022 deaths
People from Liverpool
Deaths from chronic obstructive pulmonary disease
English emigrants to Canada
English emigrants to the United States
American bartenders
American male golfers
20th-century English people
21st-century English people
20th-century American people
21st-century American people